Imboden may refer to:

Imboden (surname)
Imboden, Arkansas
Imboden Methodist Episcopal Church, South
Imboden, Virginia
Imboden District, Switzerland